The Westminster Hour is a British political news review produced by BBC News, broadcast on BBC Radio 4 each Sunday evening between 22:00 and 23:00 (starting with a national and international news bulletin). The programme began to be broadcast in April 1998.

Despite the reference in its title to the Palace of Westminster – meeting-place of the Houses of the United Kingdom Parliament – the programme also deals with topics and events connected with the work of the UK's devolved legislative assemblies in Belfast, Cardiff, Edinburgh, and London.

Presenters
The programme is currently hosted (2015) by Carolyn Quinn a former presenter of Radio 4's Today programme. It was previously hosted by the journalist Andrew Rawnsley.

References

External links
 

BBC Radio 4 programmes
BBC news radio programmes